The Battle of Calicut was a battle between the Portuguese nau Nossa Senhora da Misericórdia, commanded by João de Melo Saraiva and 21 Maratha ships that attempted to conquer the city of Calicut. The Portuguese were victorious and managed to make the Marathas retreat.

References

Calicut 1752
Calicut 1752
Calicut 1752
Calicut 1752
1752 in India
History of Kozhikode
Naval history of India